David "Daka" Popović (Serbian Cyrillic: Давид "Дака" Поповић; 28 December 1886 – 17 February 1967) was a Serbian engineer, army officer, architect, journalist, historian, and a politician who served as the first Ban of Danube Banovina, Minister of Land Reform and a senator of .

Biography

Early life and education 
Daka Popović was born on 28 December 1886 in Novi Sad where he earned his primary education. He went to a high school in Szeged and he graduated in 1913 from Royal Joseph Polytechnic, today known as Budapest University of Technology and Economics. During his studies in Budapest he worked as an illustrator for Engineering Papers magazine and engaged in athletics. He began practicing engineering in Pest after he graduated.

Mobilization in World War 1 
Popović was drafted to fight for Austria-Hungary in Summer of 1914, he was sent to fight on Serbian front. In Autumn of 1914, he was heavily wounded during a battle and he was sent back to Hungary to recover. In 1916, he became an officer of engineer corps and was sent to Romanian front, where he worked on re-construction of bridges and restorations of army communications. He was later transferred to the Italian front where he remained until the end of the war.

Architectural career 
After the World War I, Popović returned to Novi Sad where he got a job in Construction Directorate of the city. He was sent to Subotica where he worked on plans for railroad renewal in Vojvodina. For his work in Subotica he was awarded with Order of St. Sava of IV class. In 1921, Popović started his own company called "Engineer Daka Popović". His company constructed many private houses, several residential buildings and two churches. , an engineer who created plans for large expansions Danube–Tisa–Danube Canal, worked in Daka's company. Daka retreated from the construction business in 1941.

Political career 
Popović begun his political career in 1927 when he joined People's Radical Party, in the same year he was elected to a Local Assembly of Bačka Oblast. On 27 July 1928, he became Minister of Land Reform and served as the minister until the ministry was disestablished on 9 January 1929. He became the first Ban (governor) of Danube Banovina on 3 October 1929 but he resigned already on 16 January 1930 because of his disagreements with the central government. He served two terms as a senator, his second term ended on 12 November 1932.

Journalist career 
On 28 May 1936, Daka Popović co-founded daily newspaper called Dan, which became the most popular newspaper in Vojvodina. He resigned as one of the owners of the newspapers in 1938, but he continued to write about political and historical questions in Dan until it was abolished when the German occupation in World War II begun.

References 

1886 births
1967 deaths
Serbian journalists
Serbian engineers
Serbian architects
20th-century Serbian historians
Austro-Hungarian military personnel of World War I
Political office-holders in Yugoslavia
Bans of the Kingdom of Yugoslavia